Get Rhythm is a studio album by Ry Cooder. It was released in 1987.

Track listing 

 "Get Rhythm" (Johnny Cash)
 "Low Commotion" (Ry Cooder, Jim Keltner)
 "Going Back to Okinawa" (Ry Cooder)
 "Thirteen Question Method" (Chuck Berry)
 "Women Will Rule the World" (Raymond Quevedo)
 "All Shook Up" (Elvis Presley, Otis Blackwell)
 "I Can Tell by the Way You Smell" (Walter Davis)
 "Across the Borderline" (Ry Cooder, Jim Dickinson, John Hiatt)
 "Let's Have a Ball" (Allen Bunn)

Charts

Personnel
Ry Cooder - guitar, vocals, arrangements
Van Dyke Parks - keyboards
Flaco Jiménez - accordion
Steve Douglas - saxophone
Jorge Calderón - bass guitar
Buell Neidlinger - acoustic bass on 2, 6, 8
Jim Keltner - drums
Miguel Cruz - percussion
Bobby King, Terry Evans, Arnold McCuller, Willie Greene, Jr. - backing vocals
Larry Blackmon - backing vocals on "All Shook Up"
Harry Dean Stanton - backing vocals on "Across the Borderline"
Technical
Ed Cherney - recording
Steven M. Martin - art direction
Kalan Brunink - black velvet painting

References

Ry Cooder albums
1987 albums
Warner Records albums
Albums produced by Ry Cooder